Danny Lewis (born June 21, 1970) is an American-English former basketball player. He played the point guard position. In 2001-02 he was named to the Israeli Basketball Premier League Quintet.

Biography

Lewis is from Kalamazoo, Michigan. He is a nephew of former NBA player Reggie Lewis, who played for the Boston Celtics. He also became a British citizen in 2000. Lewis is 6' 1" (185 cm) tall, and weighs 185 pounds (84 kg).

He attended and played basketball for Kalamazoo Central High School. In 1988 Lewis was All-City, All-League, and All-State.

Lewis then attended and played basketball for Wayne State University ('93) in Michigan. In 1991-92 he was Second Team All-Great Lakes Intercollegiate Athletic Conference. In a game in January 1993 he set a school record with seven steals, and in a game in February 1993 he set a school record with 13 three-pointers made.  In 1992-93 he was First Team All-GLIAC, and named to the 1993 NCAA Division II men's basketball tournament Team. As of 2006 he was fifth in school history in scoring average (18.1 points per game). In 2006 the Wayne State Athletic Department named him one of the top 30 men's basketball players in school history.

He played for a number of European teams, including London Towers (England), Leche Rio Breogan Lugo and Aqua Palma Magica (Spain), Lokomotiv Rostov (Russia), and in Poland.

Lewis also played for Ironi Ramat Gan in the Israel Basketball Premier League in 2001-02.  In 2001-02 he was named to the Israeli Basketball Premier League Quintet.

References 

Living people

American expatriate basketball people in the United Kingdom

American expatriate basketball people in Russia

American expatriate basketball people in Poland

English expatriate sportspeople in Russia

English expatriate sportspeople in Israel

Ironi Ramat Gan players
Point guards

1970 births
Sportspeople from Kalamazoo, Michigan
American expatriate basketball people in Spain
American expatriate basketball people in Israel
English expatriate sportspeople in Spain
English expatriate sportspeople in Poland
American men's basketball players
Basketball players from Michigan
Wayne State Warriors men's basketball players